Harrison-Hancock Hardware Company Building was a historic commercial building located at Christiansburg, Montgomery County, Virginia.  It was built in 1910, and was a 3 1/2-story, concrete-masonry building with a shed roof.  It featured a stepped parapet and a front parapet with cornice.  It was demolished for a parking lot in 1995–1996.

It was listed on the National Register of Historic Places in 1989, and delisted in 2001.

References

Former National Register of Historic Places in Virginia
Commercial buildings on the National Register of Historic Places in Virginia
Commercial buildings completed in 1910
Buildings and structures in Montgomery County, Virginia
National Register of Historic Places in Montgomery County, Virginia